Barrett Doss (born March 20, 1989) is an American actress and singer. She is known for her role as Victoria Hughes in the ABC action drama series Station 19.

Life and career
Doss was born in Minneapolis, Minnesota. Doss's parents divorced when she was a child, and she lived with her mother, Kelly Skalicky, who later married her partner, Veronica, who shared parenting responsibilities. Her family first lived in Albuquerque, New Mexico, for two years, and later she spent most of her childhood in Chicago, and then moved to New York City. She graduated from the Professional Children's School in Manhattan. Doss attended New York University's Gallatin School of Individualized Study. In New York, she began performing on off-Broadway stage, and later on regional stage. In 2013, she made her television debut, appearing in an episode of NBC comedy series 30 Rock. She has  appeared in series including Person of Interest, Bull and Girls. In 2014, She made her Broadway debut in the comedic play You Can't Take It with You appearing opposite James Earl Jones and Rose Byrne.

In 2017, Doss starred as Rita Hanson, a female lead, in the Broadway musical comedy Groundhog Day opposite Andy Karl. She received a 2017 Theatre World Award for an Outstanding Broadway Debut Performance. Later that year, she was cast in a recurring role on the Netflix superhero series Iron Fist and has made her film debut appearing in an supporting role in the biographical drama Marshall starring Chadwick Boseman. Later in 2017, she was cast in a series regular role on the ABC action drama series Station 19, spin-off to Grey's Anatomy. The series debuted in 2018. In 2019, Doss also began appearing on a recurring basis on the sixteenth season of Grey's Anatomy.

Filmography

References

External links

1989 births
Living people
American television actresses
American stage actresses
21st-century American actresses
Actresses from Minneapolis
New York University alumni
Theatre World Award winners